Fred Wood may refer to:

 Fred Wood (cyclist) (1861–1935), English cyclist
 Fred Wood (baseball) (1865–?), Canadian-born baseball player
 Fred Wood (rugby union) (1884–1924), Australian rugby union player
 Fred Wood (politician) (born 1945), American politician in Idaho
 Fred Wood (footballer) (1901–1957), Australian rules footballer
 Fred Wood (actor) (born 1922), English actor